Simon Meyer Kuper (1906 – 20 March 1963) was a judge of the South African Supreme Court, and a noted leader in the South African Jewish community. His children include anthropologist Adam Kuper.

Early life
Kuper was born in Johannesburg in 1906. He attended Jeppe High School and subsequently gained his B.A. and LL.B. at the University of the Witwatersrand.

Career
Kuper was admitted to the Bar in 1927. He joined Group 621 of the Johannesburg Bar. After practising law for several years, he was appointed King's Counsel in 1946 and became a judge at the South African Supreme Court in 1955.

The South African Supreme Court consists of several divisions. Kuper sat in the Transvaal Provincial Division, which covers Pretoria, South Africa's administrative capital.

Civic activities
In 1946, Kuper provided evidence before the Anglo-American Commission of Inquiry on Palestine, on behalf of South African Jews.

At the February 1954 Conference on Jewish Material Claims Against Germany, Kuper represented South African Jews, together with Abel Shaban.

Kuper was chairman of the South African Jewish Board of Deputies from 1944–49, and was chairman of the South African Zionist Federation from 1950 to 1955. Kuper's resignation from the chairmanship of the latter, which was made in order to pursue his career at the Supreme Court, was honoured by a pledge to plant a grove of 1,000 trees in Israel. Kuper subsequently became honorary president of the South African Zionist Federation.

Kuper was at one time president of the United Hebrew Congregation, honorary vice-president of the Israel United Appeal, and honorary vice-president of the South African Jewish Appeal.

Death
On the evening of 8 March 1963, Kuper, who was at home with his wife and daughter, was shot through a window by an unknown assailant.
He died twelve days later.

Later that year, a hall at the Oxford Shul in Johannesburg, where Kuper had been a member of the congregation, was named in his memory. In November 1963, a new B'nai B'rith lodge, founded in Johannesburg, was named after Kuper.

Mr. Justice Ludorf said of Kuper:

References

1906 births
1963 deaths
20th-century South African lawyers
History of Zionism
People from Johannesburg
South African barristers
South African Jews
South African murder victims
South African Zionists
University of the Witwatersrand alumni